The Étoile Civique (Civic Star) was created by the Académie française in order to reward dedication to people and honor behavior and actions which attest this.

History 

Created in 1930 and named Mérite Civique (Civic Merit), it became Étoile Civique by the Journal Officiel de la République Française n° 292, page 11672 of 12 December 1968. It awards bravery and dedication to people and honor behavior and actions which attest this.

Distinguishing those who contribute to the enrichment of the community, improvement of social life, progress of Humanity, it is particularly interested in those whose lives are all of hard work, selflessness, sacrifice and will remain confined in anonymity without this award.

The Étoile Civique has three main goals:
 Improving the lives of individuals, whatever their age, nationality, color, social condition, taking into account their moral and material interests, as part of the human family ;
 The defense of human rights, respect for the duties of citizens, by express reference to the Universal Declaration that defines them ;
 To showcase the French national prestige.

Classes and insignia 

This distinction has four levels : bronze, silver, gold and silver-gilt.
The medal contains the following: « Honorer les vertus civiques – Servir le prestige national » (To honor the civic virtues – Serving national prestige). On the reverse, it is written : « l'Étoile Civique en reconnaissance à ... Promotion ... » (The Civic Star in recognition of ... Promotion ...). Degree with the same registration is also awarded.

Notable recipients 

 Maryse Bastié, French aviator ;
 Pierre Chevalier, caver and mountaineer from France ;
 Jean-Michel Dubois, French politician and a member of the far-right FN.
 Emile Garabiol, French engineer
 Bernard Pinet, French actor

References 

Awards established in 1930
Civil awards and decorations of France